Ericsson is a neighborhood within the Nokomis community in Minneapolis. Its boundaries are East 42nd and 43rd Streets to the north, Hiawatha Avenue to the east, Minnehaha Parkway to the south, and Cedar Avenue to the west. The neighborhood is the site of Lake Hiawatha, which is connected to Minnehaha Creek. Ericsson shares a neighborhood organization with Standish, even though that neighborhood lies in the Powderhorn community; signs at the western, southern, and eastern boundaries of the neighborhood welcome you to "Standish-Ericsson".

The 46th Street station of the METRO Blue Line is located in Ericsson.

References

External links
Minneapolis Neighborhood Profile - Ericsson
Standish-Ericsson Neighborhood Association
 Standish and Ericsson Neighbors Forum - Online Group

Neighborhoods in Minneapolis